The bombing of the Dutch port of Enkhuizen was carried out on 15 March 1945 by RAF planes.

Motive 
The reason for the attack was, according to British reports, the presence of 12 Wasserschutzpolizei boats which were moored in the port. These small boats had been stationed by the Germans to prevent Dutch residents from escaping to the liberated other side of IJsselmeer. There were also fears that the small boats could be used for a German attack on the liberated east of the Netherlands.

The bombardment 
At approximately 15:30 in the afternoon of Sunday, March 15, the bombardment started with an attack by four Spitfires on the small German boats. The planes flew low over Enkhuizen from the west. Though the bombs covered much of the area the boats in the dry dock were missed. The four Spitfires turned around above the IJsselmeer and returned for another attack, which was also unsuccessful. One of the British planes was hit during the attack and it came down near Katwoude. Here the pilot was rescued by the Dutch resistance, and taken into hiding for the remainder of the war. During the two minutes the bombardment lasted, the aircraft dropped 1.7 tons of bombs on the port of Enkhuizen.

Damage 
The Drommedaris bridge collapsed, and some buildings around the port, especially the timmerwerkplaats, sustained heavy damage. 23 people were killed.

References

Enkhuizen
Enkhuizen
March 1945 events
Enkhuizen
1945 in the Netherlands